Davoud Haghdoust (born January 18, 1974) is a retired Iranian football player who played for Esteghlal during the 2006–2007 season. He usually plays as a defender.

References

Iranian footballers
Iran international footballers
Association football defenders
1974 births
Living people
Esteghlal F.C. players
Zob Ahan Esfahan F.C. players
Bargh Shiraz players
21st-century Iranian people